The 30th Infantry Division "Sabauda" was an infantry division of the Royal Italian Army during World War II. The Sabauda was based in Cagliari in Sardinia and named for the Latin name of the Royal House of Savoy. After the announcement of the Armistice of Cassibile on 8 September 1943 the division joined the Italian Co-belligerent Army.

History 
The division's lineage begins with the Brigade "Reggio" established on 8 August 1859 with the 3rd and 4th infantry regiments of the Army of the United Provinces of Central Italy. On 25 March 1860 the Brigade "Reggio" entered the Royal Sardinian Army three days after the Kingdom of Sardinia had annexed the United Provinces of Central Italy. Already before entering the Royal Sardinian Army the brigade's two infantry regiments had been renumbered on 30 December 1859 as 45th Infantry Regiment and 46th Infantry Regiment.

World War I 
The brigade fought on the Italian front in World War I. On 31 October 1926 the brigade assumed the name of XXX Infantry Brigade and received the 59th Infantry Regiment "Calabria" from the disbanded Brigade "Calabria". The brigade was the infantry component of the 30th Territorial Division of Cagliari, which also included the 16th Artillery Regiment. In 1934 the division changed its name to Military Command Cagliari - 30th Infantry Division "Sabauda" and in September of the same year the division ceded the 45th Infantry Regiment "Reggio" and 59th Infantry Regiment "Calabria" to the newly activated XXXI Infantry Brigade, which was part of the newly formed Military Command Sassari - 31st Infantry Division "Caprera".

On 1 May 1935 the Military Command Cagliari raised the 60th Infantry Regiment "Calabria" in Iglesias, which in June of the same year entered the XXX Infantry Brigade.

Second Italo-Ethiopian War 
In 1935 the Sabauda was mobilized for the Second Italo-Ethiopian War. The division arrived in Massawa in Eritrea on 21 June 1935 and consisted of the 46th and 60th infantry regiments, and the 16th Artillery Regiment. the 3rd Bersaglieri Regiment was attached to the division for the duration of the campaign. Initially the Sabauda division was tasked with the border defence duties in Asmara-Dek’emhāre area. At the outbreak of the war on 3 October 1935 the division held a defensive line near Barachit and after overcoming initial Ethiopian resistance at Fik’ada (Focada) it advanced rapidly into Ethiopian territory. In November 1935 the Sabauda took Negash, Agula and Bolbala and then moved to positions on the heights overlooking the Tekezé during the Ethiopian Christmas Offensive. The division resumed its advance on 6 January 1936 only to stop for all of February 1936 in Enderta Province. The Sabauda had a minor role in the Battle of Amba Aradam on 13–27 February 1936. On 3 April 1936 the division arrived at Amba Alagi, where it won a decisive encounter and pursued the retreating Ethiopians to Agumserta and finally to Lake Ashenge. With the way to Addis Ababa open, the division surged forward, reaching Shewa Kifle Hāger village on the capital's outskirts on 26 April 1936, and captured Addis Ababa itself on 5 May 1936. The division remained in the capital until December 1936, when it returned to Sardinia.

World War II 
In early 1939 the 45th Infantry Regiment "Reggio" in Sassari and the 60th Infantry Regiment "Calabria" in Iglesias switched names and on 15 April 1939 the Sabauda dissolved the XXX Infantry Brigade, with the two infantry regiments coming under direct command of the division. On the same date the 16th Artillery Regiment received the name "Sabauda". The division was tasked with the defence of southern Sardinia, as part of the XIII Army Corps.

In June 1940 the division's sector was reduced to the area of Sulcis, where a allied landing was deemed most likely. In December 1941 the 205th Coastal Division was activated in Carbonia, which took up the coastal defense duty, with the Sabauda tasked as mobile reserve behind the 205th Coastal Division. The Sabauda remained at its positions until the Armistice of Cassibile was announced on 8 September 1943. On 10 September 1943 the division repositioned itself northwards along the Villacidro-Samassi-Selegas-Suelli line to deflect an expected attack by the German 90th Panzergrenadier Division. However the Wehrmacht decided to evacuate its forces to Corsica and the Italian units on Sardinia allowed them to withdraw unhindered.

After Sardinia was secured the Sabauda moved to Sicily on 10 November 1943, where it initially took up positions in the Enna-Caltanissetta region, until it relocated to the Messina-Catania-Syracuse area in September 1944. On 1 October 1944 the division was reformed as Internal Security Division "Sabauda" and for the rest of the war engaged primarily in airfield defence, policing and demining work.

Infantry Brigade "Reggio" 
On 15 August 1946 the Internal Security Division "Sabauda" was downsized to brigade and, due to the result of the 1946 Italian institutional referendum, which had resulted in the deposition of the Royal House of Savoy, the brigade was named Infantry Brigade "Reggio". The Reggio was dissolved with most of its units on 1 Februar 1948, while the 46th Infantry Regiment "Reggio" joined the Infantry Division "Aosta".

Organization

Second Italo-Ethiopian War 1935 
 30th Division "Sabauda" - General Italo Gariboldi
 3rd Bersaglieri Regiment
 XVIII, XX, and XXV Bersaglieri battalions
 LXXXIII Replacements battalion
 46th Infantry Regiment "Reggio"
 60th Infantry Regiment "Calabria"
 16th Artillery Regiment
 DXXX Machine Gun Battalion
 XXX Replacements Battalion
 30th Engineer Company

Notes:
 Each Army Division in the Ethiopian Campaign had a Pack-Mules unit of 3000 mules and three Regimental Trucks units (20 light trucks each).
 The 3rd Bersaglieri Regiment was detached during the campaign to form the core of the Oriental-Africa Fast Column.

World War II 1940-42 
  30th Infantry Division "Sabauda", in Cagliari
 45th Infantry Regiment "Sabauda", in Iglesias
 Command Company
 3x Fusilier battalions
 Support Weapons Company (65/17 infantry support guns)
 Mortar Company (81mm Mod. 35 mortars)
 46th Infantry Regiment "Sabauda", in Cagliari
 Command Company
 3x Fusilier battalions
 Support Weapons Company (65/17 infantry support guns)
 Mortar Company (81mm Mod. 35 mortars)
 16th Artillery Regiment "Sabauda", in Cagliari
 Command Unit
 I Group (100/17 howitzers)
 II Group (100/17 howitzers; raised in 1943)
 III Group (75/27 field guns)
 IV Group (75/27 field guns)
 LXXVII Anti-aircraft Artillery Group (75/46 Mod. 34 anti-aircraft guns; joined the division in 1943)
 330th Anti-aircraft Battery (20/65 Mod. 35 anti-aircraft guns)
 Ammunition and Supply Unit
 XXX Mortar Battalion (81mm Mod. 35 mortars)
 XXX Self-propelled Anti-tank Battalion (75/34 self-propelled guns; raised in 1943)
 CXXX Mixed Engineer Battalion (raised in 1943)
 30th Anti-tank Company (47/32 anti-tank guns)
 130th Anti-tank Company (47/32 anti-tank guns; raised in 1943)
 10th Engineer Company (entered the CXXX Mixed Engineer Battalion in 1943)
 30th Telegraph and Radio Operators Company (entered the CXXX Mixed Engineer Battalion in 1943)
 43rd Medical Section
 516th Field Hospital
 517th Field Hospital
 518th Field Hospital
 1x Surgical unit
 30th Transport Section
 42nd Supply Section
 45th Bakers Section
 96th Carabinieri Section
 97th Carabinieri Section
 30th Field Post Office

Attached to the division from early 1943:
 176th CC.NN. Legion "Cacciatori Guide di Sardegna"
 CLXXV CC.NN. Battalion
 CLXXVI CC.NN. Battalion
 176th CC.NN. Machine Gun Company

Commanding officers 
The division's commanding officers were:

 Generale di Divisione Ubaldo Scanagatta (1 September 1939 - 21 July 1940)
 Colonel Gino Piccini (acting, 22 July - 19 August 1940)
 Generale di Brigata Nino Sozzani (20 August 1940 - 14 February 1942)
 Generale di Giovanni Battista Zenati (15 February 1942 - 1 October 1944)

Notes

References 

 

Infantry divisions of Italy in World War II
Divisions of Italy of the Second Italo-Ethiopian War
Military units and formations disestablished in 1944
Military units and formations established in 1934